St. Thomas' College (Autonomous), Thrissur is a government aided college located in Thrissur, Kerala, India. It is founded by Mar Adolph Medlycott in 1889. It is the oldest college in the Erstwhile Princely State of Cochin and present day Thrissur district. It is the second private college to be recognised as a first grade college under the University of Madras. It is the first Catholic college in Kerala and is conducted by the Syro-Malabar Catholic Archdiocese of Thrissur.The college is affiliated with the University of Calicut. The College attained Autonomous status in 2014 and was recognised as College with Potential for Excellence by University Grants Commission in 2016. The College was accredited with A++ grade in its fourth cycle of National Assessment and Accreditation Council (NAAC) accreditation, scoring CGPA of 3.70 on four point scale in October 2022.

History

Started as a lower secondary school in 1889, the founder, the first Vicar Apostolic of Thrissur, Adolphus Edwin Medlycott, named it St. Thomas’ College. The college started to function in the compound of present day Bishop's House compound. In 1919, it was raised to a second grade college in arts, affiliated to the University of Madras.
The college was elevated as a first grade college under University of Madras in April 1925 and it is the second non-government college in Kerala to achieve that status, Union Christian College, Aluva being the first.

The buildings of the College were constructed in a phased manner. Rev. Medlycott has given a description about the College at the time of his return in 1896 as below:

 

The first building of the college is the one which is having the tower. Menacherry Hall was built in the year 1941. The Science Block (present day Academic Block on the opposite side of the road) was built in 1956.

In 2004, St. Thomas' was accredited with a B++ grade by NAAC, an autonomous organization instituted by the UGC. In September 2010, The college was re-accredited with A grade by NAAC. The College attained A Grade in its NAAC reaccreditation in 2016. In October 2022, the college attained A++ grade in its fourth cycle of NAAC accreditation. 

The year 2018-2019 was celebrated as Sathyaprayan 1919-2019, the centennial as second grade college and the commemoration was inaugurated by Honourable President of India, Shri Ram Nath Kovind on 7 August 2018.

Academic programmes
The college offers graduate, postgraduate and Ph.D. level programmes in a wide range of subjects. There are twenty-four teaching departments (including ten research departments and the thirteen postgraduate departments) which encompass 140 teachers.

Departments

Humanities
Department of History
Department of Political Science
Languages
Department of English
Department of Hindi
Department of Malayalam
Department of Sanskrit
Mathematical Sciences
Department of Mathematics
Department of Statistics
Computer Science and Application
Department of Computer Science
Department of Computer Application
Department of Data Science
Life Sciences
Department of Botany
Department of Zoology
Physical Sciences
Department of Physics
Department of Chemistry
Department of Electronics
Social Sciences
Department of Commerce
Department of Criminology and Police Science
Department of Economics
Department of Forensic Science
Department of Management Studies
Department of Media Studies
Department of Psychology
Department of Social Work
Other
Department of Library and Information Studies
Department of Physical Education

Department of Physics
The Department of Physics was started in 1922 within three years of the establishment of the college itself. In 1951 a B.A Degree in Physics was started (later changed to BSc) was started with the affiliation of the Madras University. In 1961 MSc Physics (of Kerala University) was started which was a rare course in those days (one among four colleges in Kerala then). This Department offers bachelor's degrees and master's degrees in Physics.

Department of Zoology
The department of Zoology, established in 1957, was affiliated to the University of Kerala. Post Graduate course was introduced in 1969 with entomology as the special paper. The department was approved as a recognized research center under university of Calicut in 1974 and is enriched with a full-fledged Research laboratory supported by Department of Science and Technology.

Department of Statistics
In the year 1955, the Degree Course in B.A. Statistics was started under the Dept. of Mathematics and Statistics affiliated to the University of Madras. The B.A. Course was converted to three year B.Sc. course in Statistics in 1958 under the University of Kerala. The Department of Statistics was established in the year 1984.  This department offers bachelor's degrees, Master's degrees and Doctoral Studies (PhD).

Department of Library and Information Studies
The Department of Library and Information Studies has two constituents: (1) the library which supplements the academic, intellectual, informational, inspirational, spiritual and recreational requirements of the academia with its rich resources and services, and (2) the department of information studies which offers various academic programmes.

The Department of library is one of the largest and oldest college libraries in Kerala. Santhome Athenaeum, the Centennial Library of the College, houses about a hundred thousand books and subscribes to more than one hundred periodicals including journals, magazines and dailies. The library collection includes general, multidisciplinary, language and literature books in Malayalam, Sanskrit, Hindi and English language and literature along with the books in humanities,  social sciences and natural, physical and mathematical sciences. 

The valuable collections include forty sets of Encyclopӕdiae, twenty sets of Dictionaries and Directories of various categories. Some of the collections are very rare, viz. 4 editions of Encyclopædia Britannica, 2 editions of World Book Encyclopedia,  Collier's Encyclopedia (24 volumes), Funk & Wagnalls New Encyclopedia (29 volumes), Compton's Pictured Encyclopedia (15 volumes), The Book of Knowledge: The Children's Encyclopædia, International Encyclopedia of Ecology and Environment (30 volumes), Encyclopedia of Visual Art (10 volumes) and Encyclopedia of Animal World (21 volumes).  In the collection of dictionaries, there are 20 sets of various types, among them A New English Dictionary (9 volumes), published in 1888, is the rarest and the most valuable. Moreover, A Dictionary of English Language abridged by Robert Gordon Latham from that of Samuel Johnson in 1882, Malayalam-English Dictionary by Hermann Gundert and Malayalam-Portuguese Dictionary by Arnos Padre are available in the Library. Many of the old ecclesiastical books which were in the beginnings of the college were taken to the collection of Bishop's house to make room for academic books.

The College Library provides open access to its documents and any member can browse through the collections which are arranged according to Dewey Decimal Classification (DDC).  The Library provides an online catalogue to trace these books. The members can also access scholarly literature which is available online through National Library and Information Services Infrastructure for Scholarly Content (N-LIST) of UGC-INFLIBNET. Through N-LIST, members can access to 6,000+ journals, 1,99,500+ ebooks under N-LIST and 6,00,000 ebooks through National Digital Library of India. The College Library houses 30 terminals of computers for the use of students and faculty.  The Library provides reference, scholarly literature search services and similarity check for plagiarism. The seating capacity of the library is 408 which include carrels, research cubicles and learning stairs.

The academic Department of Information Studies offers the Postgraduate Certificate Programme in Information Studies. The programme is delivered entirely online using virtual learning platform and consists of three modules: information literacy, academic writing and communication, and intellectual property and its management. The programme is first of its kind in India.
Training on electronic reference management and awareness about web research profiles, citation metrics, intellectual property rights, ethical methods of research and publishing, pseudo-journals and plagiarism are also imparted by the Department. 
In the first quarter of 2020, the department started to offer the UGC approved two credit course Research and Publication Ethics online through St Thomas E-learning Platform (STEP), the Moodle instance of the college. Later it was offered online in the month of August in 2020 and 2021 and was well received by more than 600 participants from different parts of India.

Doctoral Studies (PhD)

The College is offering research programmes under the following ten departments:
Department of Botany
Department of Chemistry
Department of Commerce
Department of Computer Science
Department of Economics
Department of English
Department of Mathematics
Department of Physics
Department of Statistics
Department of Zoology

Notable alumni

 Alphons Joseph - Malayalam Film Music Director
Ashok Menon, Former Judge, Kerala High Court
 Anil Akkara, Former Member Of Kerala Legislative Assembly
 Arun G Raghavan, Actor
 Atlas Ramachandran, Former Banker, Entrepreneur 
 Biju Menon, Actor
 C. Achutha Menon - Indian Communist Leader and Chief Minister of Kerala state
 C. Janardhanan, Communist Leader, Former Member of Parliament 
 Chinmayananda Saraswati -  Chinmaya Mission
 C. Raveendranath, Former Minister for General education Government of kerala
 Devan- Malayalam Film Actor
 E. Santhosh Kumar, Winner of The Kerala Sahithya Academy Award for the best novel in 2012.
 Eknath Easwaran - Internationally respected spiritual teacher
 Eluvathingal Devassy Jemmis - Padma Shri awardee, Professor at Indian Institutes of Science Education and Research
 EMS Namboodiripad - Indian Communist Leader and first Chief Minister of Kerala state              
 George Alapatt - Fourth Bishop of Syro-Malabar Catholic Archdiocese of Thrissur
 George Menachery – Historian
 Hariharan (director)
 Johnson- Malayalam Music Director
 Joseph Mundassery - Noted Literary critique and Education Minister of Kerala 
 Kochouseph Chittilappilly - MD of V-Guard Industries Ltd
 Mar Aprem Mooken - Metropolitan of the Church of the East in India
 Mathai Manjooran - Indian Independence Activist
 Mukundan C. Menon, Journalist
 M. O. Joseph, Film Producer 
 Narain (actor), Actor 
 Ouseppachan - Malayalam Film Music Director
 P. T. Kunju Muhammed- Malayalam Film Director and Producer
 Panampilly Govinda Menon - First Prime Minister of Cochin, Last Chief Minister of Travancore-Cochin and Union Cabinet minister for Law and Railways.
 Paulose II (Indian Orthodox Church) - Supreme primate of the Malankara Orthodox Syrian Church
 Ranjith Sankar, Director 
 Shine Tom Chacko, Actor
 T. J. Saneesh Kumar Joseph, Member Of Kerala Legislative Assembly
 T. Pradeep - Professor of Chemistry, Chennai
 T. G. Ravi- Malayalam Film Actor
 V. M. Sudheeran- Political leader
 Victor Manjila- Former Indian Football Player
 Vijayarajamallika, Poet, Activist

Notable faculty
 Joseph Mundassery
 A. Sreedhara Menon
 George Menachery
 C. Raveendranath
 K. A. Jayaseelan

See also
Christ College, Irinjalakuda
Vimala College
St. Joseph's College, Irinjalakuda
University of Calicut

References

External links

Official Website of St. Thomas' College Thrissur
Official website of Department of Computer Science, St. Thomas' College, Thrissur
Thrissur Colleges

Catholic universities and colleges in India
Archdiocese of Thrissur
Arts and Science colleges in Kerala
Colleges affiliated with the University of Calicut
Colleges in Thrissur
Educational institutions established in 1889
1889 establishments in British India
Academic institutions formerly affiliated with the University of Madras